Brachyopa quadrimaculosa is a European species of hoverfly.

Distribution
Israel.

References

Diptera of Europe
Eristalinae
Insects described in 1981
Taxa named by F. Christian Thompson